German rapper Kollegah has released eight studio albums, ten mixtapes, six extended plays, three label samplers, two compilation albums, five collaborative albums and sixty-six singles. His debut album Alphagene (2007) entered the charts at number 51 in Germany. His follow-up eponymous 2008 record experienced similar moderate success. His fourth studio album Bossaura was released in October 2011 and peaked at number five in his native country. To date, the rapper has released three more albums: King (2014), Zuhältertape Volume 4 (2015) and Imperator (2016); both King and Imperator topped the album charts in German-speaking Europe and were certified gold and platinum in Germany and Austria.

Kollegah has worked with rapper Farid Bang on several collaborative albums. After releasing Jung, brutal, gutaussehend (2009) (Young, brutal, good-looking), the duo premiered a second album, Jung, brutal, gutaussehend 2 in 2013. It became Kollegah's first work to top the charts in Austria, Germany and Switzerland. Critically acclaimed, it was certified gold in Germany and Austria. Their follow-up record, Jung, brutal, gutaussehend 3, experienced similar success and attained gold status in Kollegah's native country eight days before to its release in December 2017. It spawned three singles, including the chart-topping "Sturmmaske auf (Intro)" and the top ten singles "Gamechanger" and "Ave Maria".

Albums

Studio albums

Collaborative albums

Mixtapes

Compilation albums

Sampler albums

Extended plays

Singles

As lead artist

As featured artist

Other charted songs

Guest appearances

Music videos

As lead artist

As featured artist

Notes

References

Discography
Discographies of German artists
Hip hop discographies